Shifnal Town Football Club is a football club based in Shifnal, Shropshire, England. They have reached the 4th round of the FA Vase three times in their history.

History
Although other clubs with similar names had played in the town since Victorian times, the modern incarnation of Shifnal Town FC was founded in 1964 as St Andrews Youth Club FC, based at Idsall School and initially playing in the Wellington and District League.  They soon changed their name to Shifnal Juniors and in 1968 were promoted to Division Two, which they won at the first attempt and then successfully applied to join the Shropshire County Football League. In 1972 the club changed its name once again to Shifnal Town and in 1976 the team won the County League title and were elected to the West Midlands (Regional) League.

In 1979, the club, by now playing at Admirals Park, won promotion to the Premier Division. They went on to win consecutive Premier Division Championships in 1980–81 and 1981–82, with promotion to the Southern League only being denied due to a lack of floodlights.

In 1985 the club saw their lease on Admirals Park terminated and were forced to resign from the league and return to the County league, playing once again at Idsall School.  Nonetheless, the club was able to purchase the land to build a new ground, Phoenix Park. At the same time, success in the County league saw them able to step up to the Midland Football Combination in 1993–94, with a successful first season enabling them to become founder members of the new Midland Football Alliance.  Their best season at this level was their first, after which their performances declined until they finished bottom in 1997–98, and only avoided relegation as no clubs from the Alliance's feeder leagues were eligible for promotion.

The club finally succumbed to relegation in 2003, and spent three seasons back in the Midland Combination before a re-organisation of the leagues in the West Midlands area in 2006 saw them return to the West Midlands (Regional) League after an absence of 20 years, where they were crowned league champions at the first attempt.

In 2021 the club were promoted to the Premier Division of the Midland League based on their results in the abandoned 2019–20 and 2020–21 seasons.

Honours
West Midlands (Regional) League Premier Division
Champions 1980–81, 1981–82, 2006–07
West Midlands (Regional) League Division One
Champions 1978–79, 2015–16

Club records
Best league position: 6th in Midland Football Alliance, 1994–95
Best FA Cup performance: 4th qualifying round, 1982–83
Best FA Vase performance: 4th round, 1981–82, 1982–83, 1983–84

See also
Shropshire#Football

References

External links
Official website

Football clubs in England
Football clubs in Shropshire
Association football clubs established in 1964
West Midlands (Regional) League
Midland Football Alliance
1964 establishments in England
Shropshire County Premier Football League
Shifnal
Midland Football League